Abdulaziz Al-Janoubi (born 20 July 1974) is a retired Saudi Arabian footballer. He played in a defensive role.

Al-Janoubi played club football for Al-Nassr, including at the 2000 FIFA Club World Championship. He was also part of the Saudi Arabia national football team at the 1998 FIFA World Cup.

References

External links

1974 births
Living people
Saudi Arabian footballers
Saudi Arabia international footballers
Association football defenders
1998 FIFA World Cup players
Al Nassr FC players
Sdoos Club players
Al-Hamadah Club players
Saudi First Division League players
Saudi Professional League players
Saudi Second Division players